Vehkajärvi is a medium-sized lake in Finland. It is located at the border of Pirkanmaa, Päijänne Tavastia and Central Finland regions in the Finnish Lakeland and there mostly in the municipality of Kangasala, and for lesser parts in the municipalities of Pälkäne, Padasjoki and Kuhmoinen.

The lake is a part of a lake system that consists of Vehkajärvi, Lummene and Vesijako. Of these three both Lummene and Vesijako are bifurcation lakes and Vehkajärvi is situated between them so that waters from Lummene flow in two directions: eastwards into lake Päijänne and westwards into Vehkajärvi from which waters flow into lake Vesijako. From lake Vesijako there are two outflows: one eastwards into lake Päijänne, part of Kymijoki basin that drains into the Gulf of Finland, and another outflow westwards into lake Kuohijärvi from which waters flow through a chain of lakes into Vanajavesi and finally into the Gulf of Bothnia through Kokemäenjoki.

In Finland there are 27 lakes that are called Vehkajärvi. This is the biggest of them.

See also
List of lakes in Finland

References

Kokemäenjoki basin
Kymi basin
Bifurcation lakes
Kuhmoinen
Lakes of Padasjoki
Lakes of Pälkäne